How to Handle Women is a 1928 American silent comedy film directed by William James Craft and starring Glenn Tryon. Bela Lugosi had a brief uncredited role as a diplomatic aide, and Krazy Kat cartoonist George Herriman played himself in a cameo appearance. It was produced and distributed by Universal Pictures. The film had several working titles: Fresh Every Hour, The Prince of Peanuts, Meet the Prince, The Prince of Knuts and Three Days.

The Library of Congress has a "digital file containing a 300-foot 16mm fragment from one reel (reel one) loaned by a collector".

Plot
Leonard Higgins (Glenn Tryon), a young up-and-coming New York cartoonist, meets Prince Hendryx (Raymond Keane), the ruler of Vulgaria who is visiting the United States trying to persuade some wealthy businessmen to invest in his tiny country. Higgins decides to help the Prince by using his cartooning skills to advertise Vulgaria's peanut crop, which in reality does not exist. Higgins invites a number of wealthy people to a fancy banquet at the Vulgarian Embassy. The gimmick is that each course of the dinner is to be made entirely from peanuts, including the soup, steaks, desserts, etc. and all of them taste horrible. Meanwhile, the evil Count Olaff (Mario Carillo) shows up to sabotage the dinner, so that he can depose Prince Hendryx and become the ruler of Vulgaria. Higgins inpersonates the Prince and hosts the banquet himself. As a bonus, Higgins winds up winning the affections of the lovely Beatrice Fairbanks (Marion Nixon) in the end.

Cast
Glenn Tryon as Leonard Higgins
Marian Nixon as Beatrice Fairbanks
Raymond Keane as Prince Hendryx
Mario Carillo as Count Olaf
George Herriman as himself (credited as E. H. Harriman)
Bull Montana as The Turk
Cesare Gravina as Tony
Robert T. Haines as The Editor
Leo White as The Secretary
Violet La Plante as The Stenographer
Bela Lugosi as Diplomat's Aide (uncredited)

References

External links

Lobby poster with alternate or erroneous title How to Manage Women

1928 films
American silent feature films
Films directed by William James Craft
Universal Pictures films
American black-and-white films
Lost American films
1928 comedy films
Silent American comedy films
Lost comedy films
1928 lost films
1920s American films